Blennioclinus is a genus of clinids found in the southeastern Atlantic and western Indian Ocean.

Species
There are currently two recognized species in this genus:
 Blennioclinus brachycephalus (Valenciennes, 1836) (Lace klipfish)
 Blennioclinus stella J. L. B. Smith, 1946 (Silverbubble klipfish)

References

 
Clinidae